Mill Creek is a tributary of the Ohio River,  long, in western West Virginia in the United States. According to the Geographic Names Information System, it has also been known historically as Big Mill Creek.

Mill Creek flows generally west-northwestward in a winding course through central and western Jackson County, through the city of Ripley, which may have been named for Harry Ripley, a traveling preacher said to have drowned in the creek in 1830.  Downstream of Ripley, the stream passes through a broad valley in the vicinity of the community of Cottageville and flows into the Ohio River at the community of Millwood.  Approximately the lowermost  of the stream consists of backwater caused by damming of the Ohio.  A commercial port facility is located on the creek near its mouth, handling limestone, sand, gravel, aluminum, and salt.

According to the West Virginia Department of Environmental Protection, approximately 74% of the Mill Creek watershed is forested, mainly deciduous.  Approximately 25% is used for agriculture and pasture, and less than 1% is urban.

See also
List of West Virginia rivers
Staats Mill Covered Bridge
Sarvis Fork Covered Bridge

References

Rivers of Jackson County, West Virginia
Rivers of West Virginia
Tributaries of the Ohio River